S.A. Mirat, also known as Grupo Mirat (Mirat Group), or just as Mirat, is a Spanish company founded in 1812 in Salamanca, dedicated mainly to production of manures and fertilizers. Nowadays it is one of the 100 biggest companies in Castile and León and the biggest one in  the agricultural sector in the province of Salamanca. Its commercial activity is focused on Spain and Portugal.

Its trademark Vitaterra is the largest Spanish manufacturer of garden manures and fertilizers.

The factories and structures of Mirat is the only well conserved prototype of the industry of Salamanca from the 19th century. The interior of the factory contains the remains of the Convent of Nuestra Señora de la Victoria (Our Lady of the Victory) of the 15th century, which belonged to the Order of Hieronymites.

History

The origins of the company began in 1812, the year in which Gregorio Mirat installed a starch factory in Salamanca (Spain). Afterwards, different lines of the business were developed. In 1841, his son Juan Casimiro was born, he would be very important in the development of Mirat. In 1853, Gregorio introduced his son into the business, and later the factory was called "Mirat e Hijo" (Mirat and Son).

Juan Casimiro applied knowledge acquired on his trip to France and in 1876, the company started to export abroad. The same year, in 1876, the factory was moved near to the river Tormes to the Convent of Saint Jerome. In 1881, rice starch, which was important for ironing clothes started to be  produced. During this time it turned into the one of the first factories of Salamanca that began to use steam as a motive power. Also at their disposal was one storehouse near to the old main square that in 1902, Casimiro decided to use for reconstruction and build some small hotels. That is why even now that place is known as "Avenida de Mirat" (Avenue of Mirat).

In 1933, the company began to work as a cooperative association and in 1963, they begin to produce compound manures. The building of the factory of Mirat is the only well-conserved industrial architecture of the 19th century in Salamanca.

Convent of Nuestra Señora de la Victoria
Inside the workshops of the factory there is the Convent of Nuestra Señora de la Victoria (Our Lady of the Victory) which belonged to the Order of Saint Jerome, which was founded in 1490 and after 3rd centuries of prosperity was destroyed by French troops during the Peninsular war.

After unsuccessful industrial experiences that demolished the main part of the building the area finally fell into Mirat family hands. They then organized the production of manures using a religious part of the building that was, still is, in good condition. The factory still has remains of the walls, cellars and some parts of the old convent. Between the remains stands a huge vaulted arch of 3 meters by Juan de Álava (designer of the Casa de las Muertes (House of Death), of the College Fonseca and of the "Seven Emblems of the University of Salamanca") and some others stone emblems. The flues, the workshops of the 16th century, high arcades of bricks and arches complete the testimony of the industrialization period.

Divisions of the Group

Fertilizers
Seed
Division of gardening: Vitaterra, Vitaterra Nature, Mas Plant. Vitaterra is the largest Spanish manufacturer of garden manures and fertilizers.
Wineries Valdeviñas: Mirat, Tinar, Torrelanga.
Agricultural machinery
Fuel Distribution
Bus lines
Service points
Plant health.

Gallery

See also 
 Industry in Spain
 Agriculture in Spain
 Manure
 Fertilizer

References

Bibliography
 Martínez Frías, José María (1990), Monasterio de Nuestra Señora de la Victoria - La orden Jerónima en Salamanca, Ediciones Universidad de Salamanca. 
 García Figuerola, Miguel (2010), S.A. Mirat - 160 años de publicidad fabril, Museo del Comercio y la Industria de Salamanca. 
 García Figuerola, Miguel. Ordóñez, María. Zoder, Mark (2012), El Barrio de Mirat - Legado de un industrial salmantino, Museo del Comercio y la Industria de Salamanca.

External links

 

Manufacturing companies established in 1812
Agriculture companies of Spain
Manufacturing companies of Spain
Spanish brands